Scrobipalpa vaccans is a moth in the family Gelechiidae. It was described by Povolný in 1969. It is found in Afghanistan.

The forewings are light to dark ashy-grey, mixed with blackish at the apex and with three marks. The hindwings are dirty grey-whitish, with darker tips.

References

Scrobipalpa
Moths described in 1969
Taxa named by Dalibor Povolný